Robert Berger may refer to:
Robert Berger (producer) (born 1934), American film producer
Robert Berger (mathematician) (born 1938), American mathematician
Robert Berger (officer) (1914–1982), German officer and Knight's Cross recipient
Robert Berger (footballer) (born 1996), German footballer
Robert Berger (surgeon) (1929–2016), Hungarian-American surgeon